Samiul

() is an Afghan male given name, meaning listening to God. it may refer to

Samiullah (Afghan cricketer), Afghan cricketer
Samiullah (Pakistani cricketer), Pakistani cricketer
Samiullah Khan (field hockey) (born 1951), Pakistani hockey player
Samiullah Khan (cricketer), in full Samiullah Khan Niazi (born 1982), Pakistani cricketer
Samiullah Shinwari (born 1987), Afghan cricketer
Samiullah Jalatzai, Afghan detained in Bagram
Samiollah Hosseini Makarem, Iranian Politician

Arabic masculine given names